John Ross Key (16 July 1832, Hagerstown, Maryland – 24 March 1920, Baltimore) was an American artist most known for his frontier landscapes.

Key was the grandson of Francis Scott Key, author of "The Star-Spangled Banner".

Career

From 1853 to 1856, Key was a draughtsman and map maker for the US Coast Survey in Washington, D.C.

In 1863, Key was commissioned as second lieutenant in the Corps of Engineers at Charleston, where he recorded the federal siege in his paintings.

In 1869, Key moved to the East Coast and became a member of the Society of Washington Artists and the Boston Art Club.

From 1870 to 1873, Key had a studio in San Francisco. In May 1871 his work was part of the first exhibition by the San Francisco Art Association.

After spending two years studying in Europe, Key returned to the USA and set up studios in Boston and New York. In 1876 his painting "The Golden Gate, San Francisco" won a gold medal in the Philadelphia Centennial Exhibition. The next year one hundred of his paintings were on display in the Boston Athenaeum.

References

External links

Artwork by John Ross Key

1832 births
1920 deaths
Painters from Maryland
19th-century American painters
19th-century American male artists
American male painters
20th-century American painters
20th-century American male artists